The Jamaica men's national under-18 basketball team is a national basketball team of Jamaica, governed by the Jamaica Basketball Association.
It represents the country in international under-18 (under age 18) basketball competitions.

See also
Jamaica men's national basketball team

References

External links
Archived records of Jamaica team participations

Basketball teams in Jamaica
Men's national under-18 basketball teams
Basketball Under